Alexander Alexandrovitch Vedyakhin (born 20 February 1977) is a Russian top manager, First Deputy Chairman of the Board of Sberbank (deputy to Herman Gref). Vedyakhin has worked in the banking sector since 1999 and has served as First Deputy Chairman of the Board of Sberbank since 2018.

In the spring of 2022 Vedyakhin was included (along with Herman Gref) in the US, Canada and UK sanctions lists.

Education
Alexander Vedyakhin was born on 20 February 1977 in Volgograd, the fourth largest city on the Volga river, the administrative centre of the Volgograd Oblast, and a large industrial and university centre.

Vedyakhin graduated in 1999 from the Volgograd State Technical University with an honours (cum laude) degree in global economics. In 2001, he was awarded a degree of Candidate of Economic Sciences.

In 2010, he graduated from the Banking MBA program at the Academy of National Economy under the Government of the Russian Federation majoring in Banking Management. Two years later, Vedyakhin completed a joint advanced training program between Sberbank and London Business School.
From 2016-2018, Alexander trained regularly at the Stanford Graduate School of Business. In 2018, he completed a course in Artificial Intelligence and Machine Learning at the Massachusetts Institute of Technology.

Career

Before Sberbank's top positions (1999–2015) 
Between 1999 and 2008, Vedyakhin was employed at the Volgograd branch of Sberbank (Russia), where he advanced from a senior cashier-controller to deputy manager. In 2008, he took the position of First Deputy Chairman of the Board of Sberbank in Ukraine. After the purchase of the Turkish DenizBank by Sberbank (2012), Vedyakhin moved to the position of Chief Risk Officer (CRO) and joined the Board of Directors of the Turkish bank.

Sberbank's top positions (2015—present) 
In July 2015, Vedyakhin moved to work in the central office of Sberbank and became Senior Vice President, Chief Risk Officer of Sberbank Group, Head of the Risk Block. He oversaw Artificial Intelligence Laboratory and the Competence Development Centre for Data Research.

Since June 2018, Vedyakhin has been a member of the executive board and First Deputy Chairman of the executive board. He oversees sections related to retail business, corporate investments, wealth management, and the department on working with complex activities.

According to Dmitry Chernyshenko, the Deputy Prime Minister of the Russian Federation , Sberbank “has become a world-class ecosystem that competes with international platforms, while remaining the most profitable bank,” thanks to Alexander Vedyakhin. Chernyshenko also noted that due to the active participation of Alexander Vedyakhin, the National Code of Ethics for Artificial Intelligence and the federal project of the same name were developed, resulting in Sberbank becoming the federal centre of competence in the field of AI.

Current posts
Vedyakhin is First Deputy Chairman of the Board]] of Sberbank. He oversees the development of the B2B Digital ecosystem, the sales network and international business of the Sberbank Group, Head of ESG-direction at Sberbank. He also heads and oversees the Department of development of AI and Machine Learning, AI Laboratory, Direction for control and coordination of activities, Centre for partnership financing and special projects.

In addition, Vedyakhin is a member of the board and Academic Council of Sberbank's Corporate University; a director of the Skolkovo Foundation; on the supervisory board of the FinTech Association (Russia). He is also on government working groups concerning systemic technological changes in the field of industrial construction, research centres in the field of Artificial Intelligence, and the Centre for the Fourth Industrial Revolution in Russia.

Awards and recognition
On 17 November 2016, Alexander Vedyakhin was awarded the Medal of the Order "For Merit to the Fatherland", 2nd class "for a great contribution to the development and improvement of the banking system". In 2021 Vedyakhin was awarded the Order of Alexander Nevsky.
 
He was acknowledged as third on the list of “Top 1000 Russian Managers Rating 2020” and as number two on the list of “Top 1000 Russian Managers Rating 2021” in the category of Commercial Directors (Banks).

Family
He is married and has two daughters.

References

External links
Profiles

Interviews & columns

1977 births
Living people
Russian bankers
Russian Presidential Academy of National Economy and Public Administration alumni
Russian individuals subject to European Union sanctions
Recipients of the Medal of the Order "For Merit to the Fatherland" II class
Recipients of the Order of Alexander Nevsky